The World Trade Center Plaza Sculpture, also called Cloud Fortress, was a sculpture created by Japanese artist Masayuki Nagare in 1972, located at the World Trade Center complex at the Church Street entrance to site's the primary internal 6-acre plaza. 

Having survived the September 11 attacks, the sculpture was demolished during subsequent emergency efforts to access and clear the site.

Design
was completed in 1972 and depicted an abstraction of two pyramids attached at their bases and tilted upward. Although appearing solid, the work consisted of a veneer of black Swedish granite over a steel and concrete armature.

Nagare incorporated a technique he called 'ware hada', literally cracked skin or broken texture, to feature contrasting polished and rough faces.

History
The Port Authority allocated up to 1% of the World Trade Center construction cost to the purchase of art for the complex, and established an advisory group to recommend and commission artwork. 

Completed in 1972, Cloud Fortress occupied a minor plaza between buildings 4 and 5 that gave access from Church Street to the large Austin J. Tobin Plaza central to the complex of World Trade Center buildings. 

The sculpture survived the immediate attacks and collapse of the adjacent buildings, but was demolished several days later by emergency efforts to access and clear the site and provide a stable area for heavy machinery to further access Austin J. Tobin Plaza.

See also
 Artwork damaged or destroyed in the September 11 attacks

References

Destroyed sculptures
World Trade Center

1972 establishments in New York City
2001 disestablishments in New York (state)
Artworks in the World Trade Center